The Best Christmas... Ever! is a compilation album released by EMI in 2006. It contains Polish and English Christmas songs, and Christmas songs from other countries.

Track listing

CD 1 
 Queen – "Thank God It's Christmas" 
 Chris Rea – "Driving Home For Christmas" 
 Jamie Cullum – "Next Year, Baby" 
 The Moody Blues – "Don't Need A Reindeer" 
 Paul McCartney – "Wonderful Christmas Time"
 Stacie Orrico – "O Come All Ye Faithful"  
 The Band – "Christmas Must Be Tonight" 
 Wizzard – "I Wish It Could Be Christmas Everyday" 
 The Jackson 5 – "Frosty The Snowman" 
 Jose Feliciano – "Feliz Navidad" 
 Cliff Richard – "Mistletoe And Wine" 
 Slade – "Merry Xmas Everybody" 
 Jethro Tull – "Ring Out Solstice Bells" 
 Billie – "Last Christmas" 
 Band Aid – "Do They Know It's Christmas?" 
 Faith Evans – "Soulful Christmas"
 Mindi Abair – "I Can't Wait For Christmas" 
 Dave Koz – "December Makes Me Feel This Way" 
 Kate Winslet – "What If" 
 Sinéad O'Connor – "Silent Night Holy Night"

CD 2 
 Krzysztof Kiljański – "Od Świąt do Świąt" 
 Czerwone Gitary – "Dzień jeden w roku" 
 Katarzyna Skrzynecka – "Oszaleli Anieli" 
 Mietek Szcześniak & Kayah – "Raduj się świecie" 
 Quligowscy – "Z kopyta kulig rwie" 
 Ewelina Flinta – "Mikołaj jedzie tu znów" 
 Why Not? – "On Christmas Day" 
 Anita Lipnicka – "Winter Song" 
 PiN – "Święty czas" 
 Raz Dwa Trzy – "Pod niebem"
 Anna Maria Jopek & Jeremi Przybora – "Na całej połaci śnieg"
 Grzegorz Turnau – "Płatki, opłatki" 
 Edyta Górniak & Krzysztof Antkowiak – "Pada śnieg" 
 Norbi – "Choinka Norbiego"
 Ha-Dwa-O! – "Magia świąt" 
 Roan – "Ten zimowy czas" 
 Zbigniew Wodecki & Cezary Klimczak – "Magia świąt"

CD 3 
 Andy Williams – "Sleigh Ride"   
 Dean Martin – "Let It Snow! Let It Snow! Let It Snow!" 
 Les Baxter – "Santa Claus’ Party"
 Kay Starr – "Everybody’s Waitin’ For The Man With The Bag" 
 The Beach Boys – "Santa Claus Is Comin’ To Town" 
 Mel & Kim – "Rockin’ Around The Christmas Tree" 
 Ray Anthony and His Bookends – "Christmas Kisses" 
 Bing Crosby – "Jingle Bells" 
 Diana Decker – "I’m a Little Christmas Cracker" 
 Lou Rawls – "Have Yourself A Very Merry Christmas" 
 Ella Fitzgerald – "God Rest Ye Merry Gentlemen" 
 Julie London – "Warm December" 
 Nancy Wilson – "What Are You Doing New Year’s Eve"
 Matt Monro – "Mary’s Boy Child" 
 Louis Armstrong – "White Christmas" 
 Mud – "Lonely This Christmas" 
 The Scaffold – "Lily The Pink" 
 Glen Campbell – "I’ll Be Home For Christmas" 
 Adam Faith – "Lonely Pup (In A Christmas Shop)" 
 Alma Cogan – "Never Do A Tango With An Eskimo" 
 Gracie Fields – "Little Donkey" 
 The Spinners – "The Twelve Days Of Christmas" 
 Al Martino – "Silver Bells"

CD 4 
 Mazowsze – "Wśród nocnej ciszy"
 Anna Maria Jopek – "Gdy się Chrystus rodzi" 
 Krzysztof Krawczyk – "Przybieżeli do Betlejem" 
 Hanna Banaszak – "W żłobie leży" 
 Ryszard Rynkowski – "Hej, w dzień narodzenia" 
 Maciej Balcar, Natalia Kukulska, Kasia Stankiewicz, Andrzej Piaseczny – "Dzisiaj w Betlejem" 
 Katarzyna Groniec – "Jezus malusieńki"
 Stanisław Soyka – "A wczora z wieczora" 
 Halina Frąckowiak & Alicja Majewska – "Lulajże Jezuniu"
 Ryszard Rynkowski – "Cicha noc" 
 Jerzy Połomski – "Mędrcy świata" 
 Natalia Kukulska – "Gdy śliczna Panna" 
 Michał Bajor – "Pasterze mili" 
 Zbigniew Wodecki – "Oj, maluśki maluśki" 
 Golec uOrkiestra – "Pójdźmy wszyscy do stajenki"
 Irena Santor – "Z narodzenia Pana" 
 Pośpieszalscy – "Północ już była"
 Mazowsze – "Bóg się rodzi"

External links
 album description (in Polish)

Christmas
Christmas compilation albums
2006 Christmas albums
2006 compilation albums